Brookesmith High School is a public high school located in Brookesmith, Texas (USA) and classified as a 1A school by the UIL. It is part of the Brookesmith Independent School District located in southwestern Brown County. In 2015, the school was rated "Met Standard" by the Texas Education Agency.

Athletics
The Brookesmith Mustangs compete in these sports - 

Basketball
Cross Country
6-Man Football
Golf
Tennis
Track

See also

List of Six-man football stadiums in Texas
List of high schools in Texas

References

External links
 Brookesmith ISD

Schools in Brown County, Texas
Public high schools in Texas
Public middle schools in Texas
Public elementary schools in Texas